The Koronis or Koronian family, also known as the Lacrimosa family, is a very large asteroid family of stony asteroids, located in the outer region of the asteroid belt. They are thought to have been formed at least two billion years ago in a catastrophic collision between two larger bodies. The Koronis family travels in a cluster along the same orbit. It has 5949 members.

This family has two subfamilies. The Karin family was formed remarkably recently in a catastrophic collision (destroying the parent body), with an estimated age of 5.72 million years. The Koronis(2) family with 246 members is the other. It formed 15 million years ago by a non-catastrophic collision with 158 Koronis.

On August 28, 1993, the Galileo spacecraft visited a member of this family, 243 Ida. A photo of Ida (and its tiny moon Dactyl) is part of the composite image at right (numbered 243).

Large members

References

External links 
 Astronomical studies of the Koronis Family
 Spins on Koronis family 

Koronis